Gariz-e Sofla (also Romanized as Gārīz-e Soflá; also known as Gorz Soflá, Kārez Sufla, Kārīz, Kārīz-e Pā’īn, and Kārīz-e Soflá) is a village in Garizat Rural District, Nir District, Taft County, Yazd Province, Iran. At the 2006 census, its population was 126, in 42 families.

References 

Populated places in Taft County